The Drummer of Bruch (Spanish:El tambor del Bruch) is a 1948 Spanish historical film directed by Ignacio F. Iquino and starring Ana Mariscal.

Synopsis 
In the midst of the Spanish War of Independence, Blas is accused of collaborating with the French army, causing the townspeople to label him a traitor. Little by little, and unwittingly, he will be involved in the rebel cause for independence. First, helping Montserrat to free her father, who is a prisoner of the French and later, joining the cause in the Battle of Bruch.

Cast
 Ana Mariscal as Monserrat Raventós 
 Carlos Agostí as Blas 
 José Nieto  
 Juan de Landa  
 Rafael Luis Calvo as Coronel Carotte 
 Jorge Greiner as Teniente Richard 
 Enrique Magalona
 Jorge Morales
 Eugenio Testa 
 Modesto Cid as Alcalde

References

Bibliography
 Mira, Alberto. The A to Z of Spanish Cinema. Rowman & Littlefield, 2010.

External links 

1948 films
Spanish historical drama films
1940s historical drama films
1940s Spanish-language films
Films directed by Ignacio F. Iquino
Films with screenplays by Ignacio F. Iquino
Spanish black-and-white films
1948 drama films
1940s Spanish films